Linwood is a hamlet and census-designated place (CDP) in the town of York, Livingston County, New York, United States. Its population was 74 as of the 2010 census. Linwood had a post office until February 6, 1993; it still has its own ZIP code, 14486.

Geography
Linwood is in northwestern Livingston County, in the northwest corner of the town of York. It is bordered to the north and west by the town of Pavilion in Genesee County.

The Linwood area drains toward Browns Creek, an east-flowing tributary of the Genesee River.

Demographics

References

Hamlets in Livingston County, New York
Hamlets in New York (state)
Census-designated places in Livingston County, New York
Census-designated places in New York (state)